Emigration from Hong Kong refers to the migration of Hong Kong residents away from Hong Kong. Reasons for migration range from livelihood hardships, such as the high cost of living and educational pressures, to economic opportunities elsewhere, such as expanded opportunities in mainland China following the Reform and Opening-Up, to various political events, such as the Japanese invasion of Hong Kong during the Second World War, the 1967 unrest, uncertainties leading up to the 1997 handover, and the 2019–2020 unrest. The largest community of Hong Kongers living outside of Hong Kong is in Mainland China, followed by the US, Canada and the UK.

History

Japanese occupation
Governor Mark Young surrendered Hong Kong to the Empire of Japan on 25 December 1941, after the British colonial authorities lost the Battle of Hong Kong against the invading Japanese forces. The occupation lasted for three years and eight months until Japan surrendered at the end of the Second World War. As a result, the population of Hong Kong dwindled from 1.6 million in 1941 to 600,000 in 1945.

Post-WWII to 1960s unrest
While post-WWII Hong Kong saw a population boom with increased migration from mainland China, the traditional ways of life in the indigenous villages in the New Territories collapsed. Unable to earn a living in the newly industrialised economy of post-war Hong Kong, many villagers exercised their right of abode in the United Kingdom and left for Europe.

Throughout the 1960s, local discontent and labour movements against British colonial rule led to growing unrest, exemplified by the 1966 and 1967 riots. This pushed some Hong Kong residents to move abroad to various countries in Southeast Asia, South Africa and South America. This wave did not come to a rest until the mid-1970s.

Lead-up to handover 
On 19 December 1984, the People's Republic of China and the United Kingdom signed the Sino-British Joint Declaration, and validated the 1997 handover of Hong Kong back to China. Political uncertainties leading up to this transfer of sovereignty, including the 1989 Tiananmen Square protests and massacre in Beijing, prompted some Hong Kong residents to migrate in the 1980s-90s.

The British government made it clear that Hong Kong subjects would not be granted British citizenship on the grounds that they were residing in a British colony, so migrants made their own arrangements. Cities such as Vancouver, Toronto, Sydney, Melbourne and London were popular destinations, and an estimated  entered Canada as a result. Peak outflows between 1988 and 1994 averaged about 55,000 per year, although many returned to Hong Kong in the early years following the handover.

Post-handover and reverse migration 

After the handover, a significant portion of Hong Kong-born emigrants to foreign countries returned to Hong Kong in a wave of return migration known as the "Hong Kong returning tide". Statistics indicate that 35% of people who emigrated from Hong Kong since the 1980s ultimately returned to the city.

Migration to Chinese mainland 
In the years following Chinese economic reform, a growing number of Hong Kongers have migrated to mainland China, in what is known as the “heading north” (Chinese: 北上)
phenomenon. Today, mainland China is home to the largest community of Hong Kongers outside of Hong Kong, with the largest concentration being in neighboring Shenzhen and other cities in the Greater Bay Area of Guangdong province.

Social issues and 2019–2020 unrest 
Social inequality and the high cost of living accelerated throughout the 2010s. This coupled with the increasing hostile stance from the Hong Kong government to universal suffrage and political expression further increased the sentiment to migrate from Hong Kong. A key milestone would be the first occasion of tear gassing of peaceful protestors in decades, which at the time was directed by the chief executive C Y Leung, and this  sparked backlash from the public and precipitated the Umbrella Movement.  Government further exacerbated the political climate, notably the Mass protests erupted in 2019 in response to proposed extradition amendments by the Carrie Lam administration, which began as peaceful demonstration but after clear cases of police violence without accountability were caught on video the situation later devolved into riots and vandalism. Chinese central government then enacting the Hong Kong national security law to enlarge the power of the police to arrest and detain.

These events have pushed some residents to leave Hong Kong, including opposition activists fleeing arrest. Both Australia and Canada widened permanent residency pathways for students, skilled workers and asylum seekers from Hong Kong. Most notably, the UK announced a citizenship pathway for BN(O) passport holders and dependents, granting three million Hongkongers eligibility for British citizenship. By the end of 2021, around 88,000 have applied for this scheme.

See also

History of Hong Kong
Demographics of Hong Kong
Hong Kong returnee
Chinese emigration
British nationality law and Hong Kong
Brain drain
Yacht people

References

History of Hong Kong